The Sacramento Convention Center Complex is a complex of entertainment venues and a convention center located in downtown Sacramento, California. The complex consists of the SAFE Credit Union Performing Arts Center (formerly Community Center Theater), the Sacramento Memorial Auditorium, and the Jean Runyon Little Theater.

Venues

SAFE Credit Union Convention Center

The SAFE Credit Union Convention Center, located at 1400 J Street, is a convention and meeting venue. The Convention Center
SAFE Credit Union acquired the naming rights to the convention center for $23 million over 25 years. Construction started in July 2019 and completed in June 2021.

SAFE Credit Union Performing Arts Center

The SAFE Credit Union Performing Arts Center, formerly known as Community Center Theater, is a 2,452 seat entertainment venue located at 1301 L Street. The theater hosts national touring artists, and Sacramento performing arts groups such as the Sacramento Ballet and the Philharmonic Orchestra. The theater opened in 1974. Designed in the brutalist style, it underwent renovations for the first time in 2021, carried out by architectural firm DLR Group.

Sacramento Memorial Auditorium

The Sacramento Memorial Auditorium, located at 1515 J Street, is a 3,867 seat multi-purpose venue. Completed in 1926, the Auditorium opened in February, 1927. Closed in 1986, the building fell into disrepair, and re-opened in 1996, after renovation, as part of the Convention Center Complex. It is listed on the National Register of Historic Places. The Auditorium  hosts a variety of events, including concerts, high school graduations, and hosted the 2007 inauguration of Governor Arnold Schwarzenegger.

California music acts that have performed at the auditorium include The Beach Boys in '64, Sonny & Cher in '65, Grateful Dead in '68, Jefferson Airplane in '68, The Doors '68, The Turtles '68, The 5th Dimension '68, Chicago in '69, Eric Burdon & War in '70, Frank Zappa in '71, Cheech & Chong in '72, Canned Heat in '72, Doobie Brothers in '72, The Eagles in '74, Steppenwolf '74, Fleetwood Mac '75, Journey (band) '77, Toto '77, Santana '79, America '79, Huey Lewis and the News '79, Sammy Hagar '80, Go-Go's '82, Motley Crue '83, Ratt '84, Night Ranger '84, Metallica '85, Dishwalla '97, John Fogerty '97, Primus '97, 311 in '97, Jane's Addiction '97, Tool '98, Sacramento's Deftones '98, Sacramento's Cake '99, The Offspring '99, 98 Degrees in '99, Lit '99, The Wallflowers '00, System of a Down '00, Linkin Park '00, Incubus '01, No Doubt '02, Papa Roach '02, Eve 6 '03, Audioslave '05, Avenged Sevenfold '06, Pat Monahan (of Train) '07, Stone Temple Pilots '08, Atreyu '09, Third Eye Blind '15, Queens of the Stone Age '18, Los Lobos '19, and Weird Al Yankovic '19.

Jean Runyon Little Theater
The Jean Runyon Little Theater, located at 1515 J Street in the Memorial Auditorium, is a 272-seat entertainment venue for smaller events. On May 24, 2000, the space was dedicated to Jean Runyon for her contributions to the Sacramento theater community.

See also
Wells Fargo Pavilion
List of convention centers in the United States
Bobby Chacon vs. Rafael Limón- their historic fourth bout was held at the auditorium.

References

External links
Sacramento California  Convention Center Homepage

Buildings and structures in Sacramento, California
Convention centers in California
Theatres in California
Concert halls in California
Economy of Sacramento, California
Tourist attractions in Sacramento, California
Event venues established in 1926
National Register of Historic Places in Sacramento, California
Romanesque Revival architecture in California
1926 establishments in California
Multi-purpose stadiums in the United States
Event venues on the National Register of Historic Places in California